Mossant was a famous brand of hat manufactured in France and well known in the United States for most of the twentieth century. The company was founded by Charles Mossant in the nineteenth century, and by 1929 more than 2,000 hats a day were being produced. Half of them were directly shipped to the U.S.;.

Notes

Hat companies
Clothing companies of France
Posters
1833 establishments in France